Pietro Magni may refer to:

Pietro Magni (sculptor) (1817–1877), Italian sculptor
Pietro Magni (engineer) (1898–1988), Italian aeronautical engineer
Pietro Magni (footballer) (1919–1992), Italian footballer and football manager